Celtic music in Poland has become more and more popular in culture, inspiring artists to perform this type of music. Since 2003, in the last week of the summer holiday Celtic Music Festival ZAMEK takes place in Będzin. It is one of the biggest Celtic festivals in Central Europe.

Polish artists representing Celtic sounds include Banshee, Beltaine, Boreash, Carrantuohill, Dair, Danar, Donegal, Duan, Filids, Forann The Green IRISH Team, Greenwood, JRM - Jig Reel Maniacs, Open Folk, Rimead, The Reelium, Shamrock, Samhain, Shannon, Sláinte!, Stonehenge, Strays, Sushee, and Ula Kapała.

Carrantuohill
Carrantuohill is a Polish band formed in 1987 that plays Celtic (Irish and Scottish) music. The group mixes Celtic roots with the climate of Slavic spirit, using instruments like bouzouki, bodhran, violin, accordion, flutes, tin whistles, uilleann pipes, zither and acoustic guitar. Drums, keyboard and bass are also used.

In 1997 they played with the Scottish group The Battlefield Band. Carrantuohill also appeared with Sounds Family, Deaf Shepherd, Midnight Court, Geraldine McGowan, Liam O’Flynn and Arty McGlynn. They were the only group representing Poland at the Euro Woodstock in Budapest in 1995.

Members

Adam Drewniok – acoustic guitar, bass.
Zbigniew Seyda – bouzouki, mandolin, cittern, acoustic guitar
Marek Sochacki – drums, conga, bongos, bells, maraca and other keyboard instruments
Dariusz Sojka – accordion, cittern, harmonica, keyboard instruments, saxophone, bodhran, flute, tin whistles, uilleann pipes
Maciej Paszek – violin
Bogdan Wita – acoustic guitar

Discography
Irish Dreams (1993)
Rocky Road to Dublin (1994)
Speed Celts (1995)
Na Żywca (1996) [Live]
Dziesięć (1997) [Ten]
Between (2000)
Inis (2002)
Touch of Ireland (2007)
Celtic Dream (2010)
25 (2012)

Shannon
Shannon is a band created by Marcin Ruminski in 1994 in Olsztyn. The artists mix the core of Celtic music (Irish, Scottish and Brittany) with rock, jazz and pop. The band former, Marcin Ruminski uses a special type of throat singing (from Tuva, Mongolia), rarely if ever combined with Celtic music to make the group easily recognisable.

The group has taken part in concerts and festivals such as:
Rainforest World Music Festival (Malaysia), Celtica (Italy), Triskell (Italy), Celtival (Italy), Celtique de Luxembourg, NovaAria (Italy), Interceltique de Lorient (France-Brittany), St. Etienne (France), Celtie d'Oc (France), Woodstock (Poland).

Members
Marcin Ruminski – whistles, great highland bagpipes, uilleann pipes, bombard, duduk, mandolin, doshpuluur, vocal
Maria Ruminska – vocal, keyboards, melodeon
Marcin Drabik  – violin, nickelharpia
Patrycja Napierala – bodhran, cajon, udu
Jacek Fedkowicz – bass

Discography
Loch Ness (1996)
Święto duchów (1997) [All Hallows Evening]
Shannon (1999)
Green hypnosis (2003)
Tchort Vee Scoont Folk! (2005)
Psychofolk (2007)
Celtification (2010)
8th (2013)

Stonehenge
Stonehenge is a band created in 1996 and named after the Neolithic circle of standing stones in England.

The band's repertoire includes traditional Celtic dances: jigs, reels and hornpipes.

In 2000 the album Echo Wyspy was produced in cooperation with the Cuban drummer Jose Torres. During that time Stonehenge also collaborated with the dance group Comhlanand Kilsheelan

Members
Arkadiusz KOSMOS Wasik – guitars, vocal
Kamil Krzanowski – violin
Janusz Jurczak – accordion, highland bagpipes
Pawel Lemanski – keyboards, loops
Piotr Fujcik – bass
Marcin KWACHU Kisiel – drums

Discography
Magic of Celtic Music (1999)
Echo of the Island (2000)
Celtic Express (2005)

Beltaine
Beltaine, a band created in 2002. They’ve released three studio albums and one involving the tour with Jochen Vogel. They mix traditional Celtic sounds with modern beats.

All of their study albums won „Wirtualne Gęśle” (voting organized by the Polish Radio) and were given the title of the Best Folk Album of a Year.

In 2011 Beltaine received „Irish Music Award” as the Top Celtic Rock Band by American Irish Association.

The band performed in festivals, for example: Montreal Tall Ships Races (Canada), Pittsburgh Irish Festival (USA), Shetland Folk Festival (Shetland), Ollin Kan Festival (Mexico 2009), Rainforest World Music Festival (Malaysia), Festival Interceltico de Sendim (Portugal), FolkCelta Festival (Portugal), Sendim Festival (Portugal), Pozoblanco Festival (Spain), Festival Pardinas (Spain), Catalunya Celta, Festival (Spain), Celtie d’Oc (France), Paimpol Festival (France)

Members
Adam Romanski – fiddle
Grzegorz Chudy – low whistle, vocal, accordion, bombard, bansuri
Lukasz Kulesza – acoustic guitar
Bartlomiej Dudek – bass guitar
Jan Kubek – tabla, cajon, djembe
Jan Galczewski – Irish bouzouki, electric guitar, galician bagpipes, bodhran
Mateusz Sopata – drums

Discography
Rockhill (2004)
KONCENtRAD (2007)
Triu (2010)
Live (2011)

References

Sources

Celtic music groups